The Boise River Greenbelt is a recreational and alternate transportation trail along the banks of the Boise River through Boise, Idaho, United States. The Boise Greenbelt is more of a greenway than a  green belt since its character is linear.  It extends more than 20 miles (32 km) beginning at Lucky Peak Dam in the east to a short distance beyond Eagle Road (Idaho State Highway 55) in the west in Eagle, Idaho. Taking into account both sides of the river and other parallel trails and spurs, the total Greenbelt trail system measures more than 30 miles (48 km).

The Greenbelt connects Boise's riverside parks and connects Boise with neighboring municipalities. The majority of the Greenbelt is paved with asphalt or concrete on both sides of the river. However some sections are unpaved and bicycles may be prohibited on some unpaved sections. Where this occurs, bicycles have alternate routes on residential streets or dedicated bike paths. Motorized vehicles are prohibited on all parts of the Greenbelt. Segways are allowed on the Greenbelt in the City of Boise providing a special permit has been obtained.

History
In 1962, the City of Boise hired a consultant, Atkinson & Associates, to create Boise's first comprehensive plan. The plan suggested the city should acquire land along the Boise River to create a continuous "green belt" of public lands stretching the entire length of the community. A local grassroots effort to clean up the waterway and create public access to the river corridor began to take hold. This vision caught on, and by 1967 three small parcels of land were donated to the city to launch the "green belt."

In 1968, with public interest and support growing, the first Greenbelt Plan and Guidelines were adopted by the Board of Parks Commissioners. The City of Boise continued to slowly piece together a patchwork of land along the corridor using several methods of acquisition including purchase, exchange, leasing and receiving donations of property by individuals, civic groups and corporations.

Points of interest

North Bank, from east to west

 Lucky Peak Dam
 Lucky Peak State Park
 Boise River Diversion Dam (New York Canal)
 State Highway 21 Bridge
 Idaho Shakespeare Festival
 Eckert Road spur and bridge to Barber Park
 Marianne Williams Park
 East Parkcenter Boulevard Bridge
 Warm Springs Golf Course
 Marden Pedestrian Bridge (Baybrook Court)
 Kristin Armstrong Municipal Park, Morrison Knudsen Nature Center
 West Parkcenter Boulevard Bridge
 The Ram Restaurant and Brewery
 Broadway Avenue Bridge
 Bob Gibb Friendship Pedestrian Bridge
 Julia Davis Park
 Solar System Model
 Downtown Boise
 Capitol Boulevard Memorial Bridge
 Boise City Main Library
 Anne Frank Human Rights Memorial
 Old 8th Street Pedestrian Bridge
 9th Street Bridge
 Cottonwood Grille Restaurant
 Shoreline Park (first section of Greenbelt)
 Ann Morrison Park pedestrian bridge (Pioneer Footbridge)
 Americana Boulevard Bridge
 Firefighters Memorial
 Old railroad bridge (now a pedestrian bridge)
 I-184 Bridge
 Fairview Avenue Bridge
 Main Street Bridge
Lynn Henneman Cenotaph
 Quinn's Pond
 Boise River Recreation Park, Whitewater Park
 36th Street Pedestrian Bridge (Pleasanton Street)
 Esther Simplot Park (undeveloped as of 2010)
 Veterans Memorial Park
 Veterans Parkway Bridge
 Willow Lane Park
 Plantation Island and pedestrian bridges
 Glenwood Street Bridge
 Riverside Village subdivision detour
 Eagle River Pavilion
 Island Woods pedestrian bridge
 Merrill Park
 Eagle Hilton Garden Inn
 Eagle Road Bridge

However, two pedestrian bridges carry traffic to the south bank trail via an area known as Plantation Island.

Also on the north bank, approximately 1/4 mile west of Glenwood Bridge the greenbelt becomes a bicycle dismount zone at the Riverside Village residential development. The bicycle dismount zone continues approximately  westward. As of April 2008 Garden City has made it a misdemeanor to ride a bicycle on the greenbelt through Riverside Village. However, there is a roughly parallel signed bicycle route which allows bicyclists to continue westward on residential streets to the City of Eagle greenbelt without having to ride on busy State Street (State Highway 44).

South Bank, from east to west

 Barber Park
 Bown Crossing, A New Urbanism style district
 Parkcenter Blvd. residential area
 Baybrook Court Footbridge
 Boise State University
 Ann Morrison Park
 Kathryn Albertson Park
 Joe's Crab Shack Restaurant
 Riverside Hotel
 Garden City Boys and Girls Club
 Plantation Island
 Expo Idaho
 Glenwood Street bridge
 Garden City Library

Bicyclists are routed on a circuitous route on residential neighborhood streets.

A more significant gap in the south bank trail is at the west end of Ann Morrison Park where there is a  gap from the Americana Boulevard bridge westward to the Main Street bridge.

Boise River Greenbelt DOTS

DOTS is an acronym for Distance & Orientation Trail System. Serving as mileposts, there are over 100 white dots 18 inches (45 cm) in diameter painted on the greenbelt. The purpose of the DOTS is to aid people in locating their position on the greenbelt relative to the downtown Boise central point. The central point, mile 0, is located near the intersection of 8th Street and River Street in downtown Boise. The DOTS are spaced at  increments.

Riverside Village Controversy 
A stretch of greenbelt west of Glenwood Street in Garden City on the north side has been closed in varying degrees over the last three decades. The former Idaho state land was offered on condition that "...they shall construct certain improvements on the State land consisting of a bike path, lakes, pedestrian bridges (where the latter are required to assure a continuous linkage of greenbelt next to the Boise River for the length of the Riverside Village project)...", but these terms have never been met. At one point a stretch even had a sign posted stating "Private Property. No Trespassing. This is not part of the Boise Greenbelt. Violators will be prosecuted." In 2007, a ban on bicycles through this stretch was approved by Garden City Mayor John Evans. Evans oversaw construction of the Riverside Village neighborhood as the development manager for Idaho Forest Industries (IFI) and Evans Brothers Construction.

See also
 List of parks in Boise

References

Sources
 City of Boise Parks Greenbelt web page
 City of Boise Greenbelt DOTS information
 City of Garden City Greenbelt web page
 http://biology.boisestate.edu/environment/boise-river-greenbelt/
 Bowen, Gordon S. "Boise's Parks; A Cause and a Trust"
 Proctor, David. "The Boise River Greenbelt, Civic Courage, Public Benefit" Unpublished Manuscript, Boise City Historian's Office
 Rodgers, Ellie. Idaho Statesman, "The Hard Work Begins" September 28, 1999
 Stacy, Susan M. "When the River Rises: Flood Control on the Boise River"

Comparable Trails
 Sacramento, CA, Jedediah Smith Memorial Trail
 Salt Lake City, UT Jordan River Parkway
 Spokane, WA Spokane River Centennial Trail
 Idaho Falls, ID Greenbelt
 Redding, CA, Sacramento River Trail

External links
City of Boise, Parks, Greenbelt
City of Boise Segway information
Idaho Dept. of Commerce
Pictures of the 1968 Greenbelt Comprehensive Plan by Arlo Nelson.
Youtube: Boise City Council member Bill Onweiler's promotional 1970 aerial video.
Map of Garden City Greenbelt (large JPG) including Riverside Village Detour
Map of Eagle pathways including Eagle Greenbelt
 Ada County Highway District Bikeway Map

Geography of Boise, Idaho
Protected areas of Ada County, Idaho
Tourist attractions in Boise, Idaho
Green belts